Rohmer is a surname. Notable people with the surname include: 

 Ann Rohmer (born 1958), Canadian television personality
 Éric Rohmer (1920–2010), French film director
 Paul Rohmer (1876–1977),  French physician 
 Richard Rohmer (born 1924), Canadian military aviator and novelist
 Sax Rohmer (1883–1959), English novelist
 Stascha Rohmer (born 1966), German philosopher

Fictional
 Betty Rohmer, fictional character in Dead Like Me

See also
 Roamer (disambiguation)
 Romer (disambiguation)

French-language surnames